The Honourable Sir Alastair Granville Forbes (3 January 1908 – August 2001) was a Caribbean-born British colonial civil servant who served with the Colonial Legal Service and ended his career as President of the Courts of Appeal for St Helena, the Falkland Islands and British Antarctic Territories from 1965 until 1988.

Early life

Forbes was born in St Kitts, where his father, Granville Forbes, farmed and was educated at Blundell's School in Tiverton and read law at Clare College, Cambridge. After being called to the Bar by Gray's Inn, he joined the Colonial Legal Service in 1932.

Career

Forbes' first overseas posting was to Dominica in the British West Indies in 1936 as a magistrate and government officer, where much of his time was spent compiling an index of the island's laws (his assistant for many years was the barrister (later Dame) Eugenia Charles, who subsequently co-founded the Dominica Freedom Party and in 1980 became the Caribbean's first female prime minister).

After a period as a Crown attorney in the Leeward Islands in 1939, Forbes moved in 1940 to Fiji, where he served progressively as resident magistrate, crown counsel, solicitor general and assistant legal adviser to the Western Pacific High Commission. In the latter capacity he revised and redrafted all the laws of Fiji, for which he was offered (and turned down) a knighthood.

His next tour, beginning in 1947, was to Malaya as a legal draftsman, and in 1950 he was appointed Solicitor General of Northern Rhodesia. The following year he became Permanent Secretary of the Ministry of Justice and Solicitor General in Gold Coast (later to become Ghana).

In 1956, he was appointed a puisne judge in Kenya, and the next year he was promoted a Justice of Appeal at the Court of Appeal for Eastern Africa. He became Vice President of the same court in 1958, and, from 1963 until 1964, he served as Federal Justice of the Federal Supreme Court of Rhodesia and Nyasaland.

He was President of the Court of Appeal for the Seychelles from 1965 until 1976, and for Gibraltar from 1970 until 1983.
He served as a member of the panel of chairmen of industrial tribunals from 1965 until 1973, and was President of the Pensions Appeals Tribunals for England and Wales from 1973 until 1980.

Marriage
He married Constance Irene Mary Hughes-White in 1936 and was knighted in 1960. The couple had two children: Anne Margaret Banting (née Forbes; b. 1936) and Elizabeth Farrant (née Forbes; 1938 - 2015).

Sources 
Extracted from the obituary of Sir Alastair Forbes, The Daily Telegraph, 11 August 2001

1908 births
2001 deaths
British expatriates in Saint Kitts and Nevis
People educated at Blundell's School
Alumni of Clare College, Cambridge
English barristers
Members of Gray's Inn
Knights Bachelor
20th-century English judges
British colonial judges in the Americas
Gold Coast (British colony) people
British Kenya judges
British colonial judges in Africa
Northern Rhodesia people
Federation of Rhodesia and Nyasaland judges
British Seychelles judges
British colonial judges in Europe
British Antarctic Territory people
Falkland Islands judges
Colony of Fiji judges
Saint Helenian people
East African Court of Appeal judges
Colonial Legal Service officers